Sesame's Treet is a 1992 album by British rave group Smart E's.

Track listings

"Apollo (Lunar Mix)" – 4:45
"Magnificent" – 4:20
"Make It Happen" – 3:23
"Sesame's Treet" – 3:31
"Love Is Blind" – 4:59
"The Law" – 7:01*
"Charlie" – 2:17
"Loo's Control" – 4:00
"A Most Excellent Choon" – 4:01**
"Intruder Alert" – 4:58
"Bizarrely Odd" – 5:14
"Time Out" – 3:49
"Beautiful Noises" – 1:52

*Remix of "Fuck the Law", originally released on the Smart E's single "Bogus Adventure/Fuck the Law"

**Remix of "Bogus Adventure", originally released on the Smart E's single "Bogus Adventure/Fuck the Law"

References

1992 debut albums
Rave albums
Atlantic Records albums
Breakbeat hardcore albums